Colette Picard (née Durand) (1913 – 11 October 1999, Versailles) was a French archaeologist and historian. As curator of the archaeological site of Carthage, she led excavations on the hill of Byrsa in 1947.

Married to historian Gilbert Charles-Picard, Colette Picard was the mother of Hellenist Olivier Picard, former director of the École française d'Athènes and a member of the Institut de France.

References

Bibliography 
 Catalogue du musée Alaoui
1951: Carthage, Paris
1958: La vie quotidienne à Carthage au temps ď'Hannibal, IIIe siècle avant Jésus-Christ [in collaboration with G. Charles-Picard]

External links 
 Colette Picard on data.bnf.fr
 Gilbert et Colette Picard, La vie quotidienne à Carthage au temps ď Hannibal, IIIe siècle avant Jésus-Christ on Frantic
 Obituary on Persée

French archaeologists
French women archaeologists
1913 births
1999 deaths
20th-century archaeologists
20th-century French women